Orzyc (also Orzycz or Orzyca) is a river in eastern central Poland, a right tributary of the Narew, with a length of 146 kilometers.  It forms the western border of the Puszcza Kurpiowska, and flows into the Narew at Kalinowo.

Its own tributaries include the Grabowski Rów, Baranowska Struga, Tamka, Bobrynka, Ulatówka, Bramura, and Węgierka.

References 

Rivers of Poland
Rivers of Masovian Voivodeship